Serayu is an economy-class train running twice a day between  and  via , , Tasikmalaya, Cimahi and Purwakarta. The train was previously known as Cepat Sidareja, Cipuja, and Citrajaya. The name Serayu is derived from the Serayu River, which the train crosses twice on its journey.

History 
The train Galuh called at stations on this route which were skipped by both Cipuja and Citrajaya. In the early 2000s, Cipuja and Citrajaya were rebranded to Serayu. In 2013, the route was extended to Purwokerto.

Route 
The Serayu train runs four times daily, twice per direction, following the route –––––––––––––.

External links 
  Official website of PT Kereta Api Indonesia

Passenger rail transport in Indonesia